Kilmond Scar  is a Site of Special Scientific Interest in the County Durham district of south-west County Durham, England. It lies just south of the A66 road, about 3 km east of the village of Bowes.

Kilmond Scar is a prominent south-facing scarp of Upper Carboniferous Limestone. Its rock ledges and scree slopes support a variety of drought-tolerant flora. Elsewhere, deeper limestone soils support a diversity of calcareous grassland species.

References

Sites of Special Scientific Interest in County Durham
Bowes